Jacint Rigau-Ros i Serra (18 July 1659 – 29 December 1743), known in French as Hyacinthe Rigaud, was a Catalan-French baroque painter most famous for his portraits of Louis XIV and other members of the French nobility.

Biography

Rigaud was born in Perpignan, then part of the Crown of Aragon, a few months before Spain ceded the city to France under the Treaty of the Pyrenees (7 November 1659). His family, the Rigau, were Catalan; he was the son of a tailor, the grandson of painter-gilders from Roussillon, and the elder brother of another painter (Gaspard).

Rigaud was baptised with his Catalan name in the old Cathédrale Saint-Jean-Baptiste de Perpignan on 20 July 1659, two days after his birth at rue de la Porte-d'Assaut. His baptismal name was Jyacintho Rigau or Jacint Rigau i Ros This is sometimes transliterated as  Híacint Francesc Honrat Mathias Pere Martyr Andreu Joan Rigau After the Roussillon and the Cerdanya were ceded to France the following 7 November owing to the Treaty of the Pyrenees, the Rigau remained in Roussillon, and became French subjects.

He was trained in tailoring in his father's workshop, but perfected his skills as a painter under Antoine Ranc at Montpellier from 1671 onwards, before moving to Lyon four years later. It was in these cities that he became familiar with Flemish, Dutch and Italian painting, particularly that of Rubens, Van Dyck, Rembrandt and Titian, whose works he later collected. Arriving in Paris in 1681, he won the prestigious scholarship known as the prix de Rome in 1682, but on the advice of Charles Le Brun did not make the trip to Rome which was included in the scholarship. Rigaud was received into the Académie royale de peinture et de sculpture in 1710, and he rose to the top of this institution before retiring from it in 1735.

Since Rigaud's paintings captured very exact likenesses along with the subject's costumes and background details, his paintings are considered precise records of contemporary fashions.

Family
Hyacinthe's father, Josep Matias Pere Ramon Rigau, was a tailor (sastre in Catalan) in the parish of Saint-Jean de Perpignan, "as well as a painter", descended from a line of well-established artists in the Perpignanian basin who had been commissioned to decorate several tabernacles and other panels for liturgical use. Few of these have survived to the present (Palau-del-Vidre, Perpignan, Montalba-d'Amélie, Joch...). Hyacinthe's grandfather, Jacinto major, and even more Jacinto's father, Honorat minor, were heads of the family and the local art world from 1570 to 1630; probably as much as gilders as painters, since in their studios were to be found "many prints and books treating on the art of painting, and other things, such as brushes and palettes for painting".

Working for the collège Saint-Éloi in his city since 1560, and acting as representative of its guild of painters and gilders, on 22 November 1630 Jacinto major and other gilders and colleagues participated in the development of the statutes and minutes of the city's collège Saint-Luc
. Honorat minor is generally identified as the painter of The Canonisation of Saint Hyacinthe, formerly in Perpignan's Dominican convent and now at Joch, the tabernacle of the church of Palau-del-Vidre (28 March 1609) and the retable at Montalba near Amélie-les-Bains. The father of Honorat minor is generally identified as the painter of the retable of Saint-Ferréol (1623) in the église Saint-Jacques de Perpignan and formerly in the couvent des Minimes, whilst Honorat major is usually identified as the painter of the paintings of the retable of the église Saint-Jean-l'Évangéliste at Peyrestortes.

On 13 March 1647 Hyacinthe's father Matias Rigau, married Thérèse Faget (1634–1655), daughter of a carpenter. Widowed shortly after, he decided to speedily remarry, to Maria Serra, daughter of a Perpignan textile merchant (pentiner in Catalan), on 20 December 1655. In 1665, he acquired a house "en lo carrer de las casas cremades" (now rue de l'Incendie, near the cathedral) and received the income from a parcel of vineyards in the Bompas territory. By his second marriage, he also acquired a house on place de l'Huile, but he soon sold it.

Journey to Lyon

Unfortunately, little is known about Rigaud's activities in Lyon, due to the lack of surviving documents. However, as per tradition, artists from Montpellier had strong ties with this city, as had, for example, Samuel Boissière who was trained in there, in Lyon. The identity of Rigaud's future depicted models shows that he worked for the city's cloth merchants, whose flourishing trade had long since given the city its profitable income.

Even if they had only been registered from 1681 onwards, the date when he moved to Paris, his "youthful" portraits were probably pre-dated, like those of Antoine Domergue, the king's councillor and provincial governor of Lyon, in 1686, and "Mr Sarazin de Lion", of a famous dynasty of bankers of Swiss origins, in 1685. Rigaud's portrait of Jean de Brunenc, painted in 1687, a silk merchant, banker and consul of Lyon, assembles all the ingredients for which the painter was later successful.

In her thesis on the engravers from the Drevet family, Gilberte Levallois-Clavel revealed certain aspects of the private relations between Rigaud and Pierre Drevet; their friendship came about at the beginning of the 1700s, after the painter produced a portrait of the engraver, in which he depicted himself as well.

In 1681, when Hyacinthe Rigaud decided to move to Paris, inspired by Drevet who was also attracted to the capital, he had already established a good reputation amongst the local clientele, from Switzerland to Aix-en-Provence.

Going back to the artist's biography, Dezallier d'Argenville states that one of Rigaud's main reasons for his 1695 voyage was to paint his mother's portrait: "He painted her from many angles, and had her marble bust made by the notable Coysevox, which was his cabinet's ornament for the rest of his life". In his first will, dated 30 May 1707, the artist left the bust to the Grand Dauphin, Louis XIV's son, though the sculpture would then be left to the Academy which explains its presence in the Louvre. Also in the document, Rigaud bequeathed the portrait containing the two profiles of Maria Serra to the elder son of his brother Gaspard, named Hyacinthe.

In reality, Rigaud painted a second painting, bearing the three stances presented to Coysevox: an oval painting kept in a private collection, copied by Géricault, in Dijon, and the subject of one of Drevet's engravings. He also applied sketches of his sister Claire, accompanied by her husband and their first daughter, to the canvas.

The year 1695 also saw the production of two versions of Christ expiant sur la Croix, with a distinct Flemish influence, proof of Rigaud's rare incursion into the domain of historical depictions or the "great genre". He bequeathed his mother the first version which would then, at her death, be left to the Grands Augustins convent in Perpignan, and gave the second, in 1722, to the Dominican convent of his city of birth.

In spring 1696, Hyacinthe Rigaud returned to Paris, where he painted one of his most important portraits of the year. This was in fact solicited by the duke of Saint-Simon, to depict Armand Jean le Bouthillier de Rancé, an abbot, using a skillful subterfuge that remains notable in the history of painting.

 
In 1709 he was made a noble by his hometown of Perpignan. In 1727 he was made a knight of the Order of Saint Michael.
Rigaud died in Paris in 1743 at the age of 84.

Clientele
 He was one of the most important portrait painters during the reign of King Louis XIV. His instinct for impressive poses and grand presentations precisely suited the tastes of the royal personages, ambassadors, clerics, courtiers, and financiers who sat for him. Rigaud owes his celebrity to the faithful support he received from the four generations of Bourbons whose portraits he painted; namely King Louis XIV, next his son Louis, Grand Dauphin, then the King's grandson (the Grand Dauphin's son) Louis, Duke of Burgundy (also called the Petit Dauphin), and finally the Grand Dauphin's grandson (the Petit Dauphin's son), who became the next king—Louis XV, who succeeded his great-grandfather Louis XIV in 1715. He garnered the core of his clientele among the richest circles as well as among the bourgeois, financiers, nobles, industrialists and government ministers, also courting all the major ambassadors of his time and several European monarchs. His œuvre reads as a near-complete portrait gallery of the chief movers in France from 1680 to 1740. Some of that œuvre (albeit a minority) also includes those of more humble origins – Rigaud's friends, fellow artists or simple businessmen.

Rigaud is inseparable from his best-known work, a 1701 painting of Louis XIV in his coronation costume which today hangs in the Louvre in Paris, as well as the second copy also requested by Louis XIV that now hangs at the Palace of Versailles.
He is renowned for his portrait paintings of Louis XIV, the royalty and nobility of Europe, and members of their courts and considered one of the most notable French portraitists of the classical period. For Jacques Thuillier, professor at the Collège de France: 
According to the French art historian Louis Hourticq, 
True "photographs", faces that Diderot called "letters of recommendation written in the common language of all men", Rigaud's works today populate the world's major museums.

Legacy

Rigaud's works today populate the world's major museums. The exact number of paintings he produced remains in dispute, since he left a highly detailed catalogue but also more than a thousand different models which specialists agree he used. To these may be added the large number of copies in Rigaud's book of accounts, without even mentioning the hundreds of other paintings rediscovered since the accounts' publication in 1919. Rigaud painted many important figures in the world of art such as the sculptors Desjardins (to whom, as an old friend, he delivered three successive portraits), Girardon and Coysevox; the painters Joseph Parrocel, La Fosse and Mignard; the architects De Cotte, Hardouin-Mansart and Gabriel. He also painted portraits of poets such as La Fontaine or Boileau, as well as religious figures such as the cardinal de Fleury and Bossuet; many influential archbishops and bishops paid large sums of money for a portrait.

In 1820, the Musée des beaux-arts Hyacinthe Rigaud in Perpignan, France, was dedicated to him. It is still open to the public and shows some of his work.

Selected works

Portrait of Graf Philipp Ludwig Wenzel von Sinzendorf, 1712, oil on canvas, Kunsthistorisches Museum, Vienna
Portrait of Philippe de Courcillon, Marquis de Dangeau, 1702, oil on canvas, Musée national du château de Versailles et des Trianons, Versailles
Portrait of Louis XIV, 1701, oil on canvas, Musée du Louvre, Paris
Portrait of Louis XIV, c. 1700, oil on canvas, Centre Block, Parliament of Canada, Ottawa
ditto, oil on canvas, Museo del Prado, Madrid
ditto, oil on canvas, 1694 (full shot portrait), Musée du Louvre, Paris
ditto, oil on canvas, 1715 (full shot portrait, "State Portrait"), Musée national du château de Versailles et des Trianons, Versailles
Portrait of the artist's mother, 1695, oil on canvas, Musée du Louvre, Paris
Portrait of Everhard Jabach, 1688, oil on canvas, Wallraf-Richartz Museum, Cologne
Studies of Spaniels And Whippets, And A Study of a White Headdress, oil on canvas
Portrait of Louis Bossuet, location unknown
Portrait of a Scholar, oil on canvas, Hermitage Museum, St Petersburg, Russia
Portrait of Pierre Imbert Drevet, c. 1700, oil on canvas, Musée des beaux-arts de Lyon, France
Portrait of Louis XV of France at the age 5, wearing the Coronation Robes, 1715, oil on canvas, Musée national du château de Versailles et des Trianons, Versailles
Portrait of Elizabeth Charlotte of the Palatinate, c. 1719, oil on canvas, Musée national du château de Versailles et des Trianons, Versailles
Portrait of La comtesse de Selles Marguerite-Henriette de Labriffe , 1712, oil on canvas
Portrait of Charles Auguste d'Allonville de Louville, Marquis de Louville, 1708, oil on canvas, private collection
Portrait of Frederick IV of Denmark, Nationalhistoriske Museum, Frederiksborg Palace, Denmark
Portrait of Sébastien Bourdon, drawing, 1731, Städelsches Kunstinstitut und Städtische Galerie, Frankfurt am Main
Portrait of Louis Antoine de Pardaillan de Gondrin, Marquis d'Antin, c. 1710
Portrait of Augustus II the Strong, oil on canvas, 1715, Gemäldegalerie Alte Meister, Dresden
Portrait of Martin van der Bogaert, drawing, c. 1700, Städelsches Kunstinstitut, Frankfurt am Main
Portrait of a young scholar, drawing, 1685, Städelsches Kunstinstitut und Städtische Galerie, Frankfurt am Main
Portrait of Cardinal Henri Oswald de La Tour d'Auvergne, 1732, oil on canvas, private collection.
Portrait of Nicolas Le Camus, drawing, c. 1701, Städelsches Kunstinstitut und Städtische Galerie, Frankfurt am Main

Paintings

Notes

References

External links
 

1659 births
1743 deaths
17th-century French painters
French male painters
18th-century French painters
French portrait painters
Prix de Rome for painting
French Baroque painters
18th-century French male artists